The Lehigh and Susquehanna Railroad is a defunct railroad that operated in eastern Pennsylvania during the nineteenth and twentieth centuries. The company was a subsidiary of the Lehigh Coal & Navigation Company (LC&N), but for much of its lifetime leased by the Central Railroad of New Jersey. It was founded in 1837 to carry coal from the North Branch Division of the Pennsylvania Canal to the Lehigh Canal, but would later be extended to the Delaware River at Easton, Pennsylvania. It was sold to Conrail in 1976.

History

The LC&N chartered the Lehigh and Susquehanna Railroad on March 31, 1837, in order to link the North Branch Division of the Pennsylvania Canal at Wilkes-Barre and the Lehigh Canal at White Haven. Construction of the railroad began in 1839 and was completed in 1841. The arduous  route required the construction of a tunnel and three inclined planes, including the famed Ashley Planes.

In 1862, flooding damaged the Lehigh Canal north of Mauch Chunk (now Jim Thorpe). The LC&N received permission to extend the L&S south from White Haven to Easton, on the Delaware River. Regular passenger service to Easton began on February 3, 1868. New bridges over the Lehigh and Delaware Rivers on March 16 completed the line into Phillipsburg, New Jersey, with connections to the Belvidere Delaware Railroad, Central Railroad of New Jersey (CNJ), and Morris and Essex Railroad.

With the completion of the L&S, the Easton-Phillipsburg area became a major rail hub. The Lehigh Valley Railroad ran along the south side of the Lehigh River and then across the Delaware. The CNJ and Morris and Essex handled its coal traffic between Easton and New York. The L&S ran parallel to the Lehigh Valley, north of the river. The CNJ, in addition to its connections with the L&S and Lehigh Valley, forwarded traffic from the Delaware, Lackawanna and Western Railroad (DL&W) in New Jersey. This complex state of affairs was upset in 1868 when the DL&W leased the Morris and Essex, giving it direct access to the Delaware River and undermining the CNJ's position. The CNJ responded on March 31, 1871, by leasing the L&S. This gave the CNJ direct access to the coal fields in the Wyoming Valley.

In 1963, the Reading Company, which had a controlling interest in the CNJ, purchased the L&S from the LC&N. Under the agreement, the LC&N would continue to receive the lease payments from the CNJ for 35 years, at which point they would revert to the Reading. But the CNJ entered bankruptcy in 1967 and stopped the lease payments. The Lehigh Valley, itself in bankruptcy, took over the CNJ's Pennsylvania operations in 1972, including the lease of the L&S.

This situation did not last long. The distressed state of railroading in the Northeastern United States, epitomized by the 1970 bankruptcy of the Penn Central, led to the passage of the 1973 Regional Rail Reorganization Act. The act transferred the properties of the bankrupt railroads to a new government-owned railroad, Conrail. The L&S was designated for conveyance, although its unique status as a railroad leased from a non-railroad (the LC&N) required special consideration. In the end, the L&S was conveyed to Conrail in 1976; Conrail bought the leasehold interest from the LC&N in 1978 for $5.2 million.

Notes

References

External links
"Lehigh Coal and Navigation Company Records: Items 3597-3598: Map and Profiles of the Upper Grand Section of the Lehigh Navigation and Lehigh and Susquehanna Railroad", Lehigh University

 
1837 establishments in Pennsylvania
1976 disestablishments in Pennsylvania
Predecessors of Conrail
Predecessors of the Central Railroad of New Jersey
Railway lines opened in 1841
Railway lines closed in 1976